The 1931 Tour de France was the 25th edition of the Tour de France, one of cycling's Grand Tours. The Tour began in Paris with a flat stage on 30 June, and Stage 12 occurred on 13 July with a flat stage to Marseille. The race finished in Paris on 26 July.

Stage 1
30 June 1931 - Paris to Caen,

Stage 2
1 July 1931 - Caen to Dinan,

Stage 3
2 July 1931 - Dinan to Brest,

Stage 4
3 July 1931 - Brest to Vannes,

Stage 5
4 July 1931 - Vannes to Les Sables d'Olonne,

Stage 6
5 July 1931 - Les Sables d'Olonne to Bordeaux,

Stage 7
6 July 1931 - Bordeaux to Bayonne,

Stage 8
7 July 1931 - Bayonne to Pau,

Stage 9
8 July 1931 - Pau to Luchon,

Stage 10
10 July 1931 - Luchon to Perpignan,

Stage 11
12 July 1931 - Perpignan to Montpellier,

Stage 12
13 July 1931 - Montpellier to Marseille,

References

1931 Tour de France
Tour de France stages